Uroplakin-1b (UP1b), is a protein which in humans is encoded by the UPK1B gene.

Function 
The protein encoded by this gene is a member of the transmembrane 4 superfamily, also known as the tetraspanin family. Most of these members are cell-surface proteins that are characterized by the presence of four hydrophobic domains. These proteins mediate signal transduction events that play a role in the regulation of cell development, activation, growth and motility. This encoded protein is found in the asymmetrical unit membrane (AUM) where it can form a complex with other transmembrane 4 superfamily proteins. It may play a role in normal bladder epithelial physiology, possibly in regulating membrane permeability of superficial umbrella cells or in stabilizing the apical membrane through AUM/cytoskeletal interactions. The AUM is believed to be involved in strengthening the cells that line the bladder, and in enhancing the inner bladder membrane's ability to stretch, thus preventing these cells from rupturing during bladder distension. The use of alternate polyadenylation sites has been found for this gene.

References

Further reading

Uroplakins